The Women's snowboard cross competition at the FIS Freestyle Ski and Snowboarding World Championships 2019 was held on January 31 and February 1, 2019.

Qualification
The qualification was started on January 31, at 12:20.

Elimination round
The top 16 qualifiers advanced to the quarterfinals. From here, they participated in four-person elimination races, with the top two from each race advancing.

Quarterfinals

Heat 1

Heat 3

Heat 2

Heat 4

Semifinals

Heat 1

Heat 2

Finals

Small final

Big final

References

Women's snowboard cross